Wabasso Beach is a census-designated place (CDP) in Indian River County, Florida, United States. The population was 1,853 at the 2010 census, an increase of 72.4% since 2000. It is part of the Sebastian–Vero Beach Metropolitan Statistical Area.

Geography
Wabasso Beach is located at  (27.759930, -80.401189).

Demographics

As of the census of 2000, there were 1,075 people, 554 households, and 383 families residing in the CDP. The racial makeup of the CDP was 98.79% White, 0.09% African American, 0.09% Native American, 0.19% Asian, 0.37% from other races, and 0.47% from two or more races. Hispanic or Latino of any race were 1.02% of the population.

There were 554 households, out of which 9.7% had children under the age of 18 living with them, 64.8% were married couples living together, 3.8% had a female householder with no husband present, and 30.7% were non-families. 25.6% of all households were made up of individuals, and 15.7% had someone living alone who was 65 years of age or older.  The average household size was 1.94 and the average family size was 2.28.

In the CDP, the population was spread out, with 8.5% under the age of 18, 2.0% from 18 to 24, 10.5% from 25 to 44, 32.1% from 45 to 64, and 46.9% who were 65 years of age or older.  The median age was 64 years. For every 100 females, there were 94.7 males.  For every 100 females age 18 and over, there were 89.2 males.

The median income for a household in the CDP was $67,072, and the median income for a family was $74,808. Males had a median income of $75,771 versus $39,464 for females. The per capita income for the CDP was $48,690.  About 2.0% of families and 1.4% of the population were below the poverty line, including 14.8% of those under age 18 and none of those age 65 or over.

References

Census-designated places in Indian River County, Florida
Beaches of Florida
Census-designated places in Florida
Populated coastal places in Florida on the Atlantic Ocean
Beaches of Indian River County, Florida